Dangerous Years (or Dek seple) is a 1996 Thai drama film directed by Nopphorn Wathin. Based upon a novel by Chatchai Wiset Suvarnabhumi that was originally adapted for the big screen in 1960, the film follows a displaced teen who enters a life of crime. It was remade into a television series of the same name in 2020.

Plot
At a border village, there is an outbreak of violence between the Royal Thai Armed Forces and the communist movement. During the conflict, Sak's wife and daughter are killed. However, unknowingly to him, his son is able to escape.

Given the name Tin, Sak's son is raised in poverty and becomes part of a gang of thieves. One day, Tin assaults a woman and steals her purse. He eludes the police by hiding in a school where Sak happens to be teaching. From that point on, Sak tries to convince Tin that the life of a criminal is not something he should pursue.

Cast
 Chanit Yaisamer as Tin
 Karen Klongtruadroke as Kobkul
 Pisan Akaraseranee as Sak Sujaritkul
 Bawriboon Chanreuang as Jon
 Kett Thantup as Por
 Ronapop Ruj as Uncle Chod
 Ae Pairot Sangwariboot as Boonkeua
 Tuk Deuntem Salitul as Wanida

Music
The film features music by Thai boy band Boyscout, which consisted of actor Chanit Yaisamer as one of its three members. A soundtrack album was released in 1996 by RS Music.

Reception
Chanit Yaisamer won "Outstanding Performance by an Actor in a Leading Role" at the 6th Suphannahong National Film Awards, which was held in April 1997.

References

External links

1996 films
1996 drama films
Thai drama films
Thai-language films